Antony Vidmar (born 4 July 1970) is an Australian soccer coach and former player, who serves as an assistant coach with the Australia national team. He was a member of the Australia national team, competed at the 1992 Summer Olympics in Barcelona for his native country, and with 76 caps, is one of Australia's most capped players. His brother Aurelio Vidmar is also a former footballer.

Club career
Vidmar was born in Adelaide. His biggest impact in club football came whilst at Scottish side Rangers, for whom he played over 150 games and won the Scottish Premier League twice, the Scottish League Cup twice and the Scottish Cup three times. His goal against Italian side Parma in a UEFA Champions League qualifying round tie in 1999 cemented him a place in Rangers folklore. He left the club in 2002 and joined Middlesbrough on a free transfer.

He then joined Welsh side Cardiff City on a free transfer in 2003, with manager Lennie Lawrence being quick to sign him after missing out the previous year following his release from Rangers. Vidmar quickly became a fans favourite at Cardiff and made 73 appearances for the club before leaving in 2005 to re-sign for Dutch side NAC Breda, the club he had left to join Rangers.

International career
Highly criticised as one of the main weak points in the Australia national team's defence under Frank Farina's tenure, Guus Hiddink's appointment sparked a tremendous improvement in his performance, culminating in an impressive performance in the second leg of the World Cup qualifying tie against Uruguay. Vidmar notably volunteered to take his teammate Mark Bresciano's kick in the penalty shootout (after the latter had been substituted through injury). This was successfully converted, giving Australia a 3–1 lead, and they subsequently won 4–2 on penalties.

On 9 May 2006, Vidmar announced he was withdrawing himself from World Cup team selection for medical reasons, specifically an irregular heart rhythm. Doctors discovered this irregularity was due to a blood clot in his left coronary artery. Following an operation in London, Vidmar was given the all-clear to resume his professional football career. Vidmar announced his international retirement after the friendly fixture against Paraguay on 7 October 2006, in which Australia drew 1–1.

Retirement 
On 14 February 2008, Vidmar announced his retirement and an end to his decorated playing career after the 2008 A-League Grand Final. The former Socceroo defender said he wanted to end speculation about his future and thought the domestic decider was the best way to end his career. "There has been a lot of speculation on what I was going to do, whether to continue on or to end my career. I made up my mind about three weeks ago and thought that it was probably the right time to finish and that was well before we clinched our Grand Final berth."
"My aim at the start of the season was to help qualify the team for the AFC Champions League and to top that now would be very difficult." 

Vidmar said there had been many influential players on his career, which began at Adelaide City in 1989: "There are a lot of people that I'd like to thank – when I first started in the National Soccer League my first coach Zoran Matic was a huge influence for my career and every other coach that I've had since has influenced me in some way."
"I'd like to thank everyone at the Mariners – everyone in the office to the coaching staff and my team-mates, after what happened with my medical condition it was a gamble that they took to bring me here and I'd like to thank them for giving me the opportunity to finish my career in Australia, it would definitely be nice to finish it off with a Championship."

The Mariners went on to lose the Grand Final to the Newcastle Jets.

Personal life
Vidmar is the brother of Aurelio Vidmar who is also a former footballer. His daughter Mikayla Vidmar who is also a footballer recently played in A-League Women for Canberra United FC.

Career statistics

Club

International

Scores and results list Australia's goal tally first, score column indicates score after each Vidmar goal.

Honours 
Adelaide City
 NSL Championship: 1991–92, 1993–94

Rangers
 Scottish Premier League: 1998–99, 1999–2000
 Scottish Cup: 1998–99, 1999–2000, 2001–02
 Scottish League Cup: 1998–99, 2001–02

Central Coast Mariners
 A-League Premiership: 2007–08

Australia
 OFC Nations Cup: 2004
 FIFA Confederations Cup runner-up: 1997

References

External links
 Oz Football profile
 Football Database profile

1970 births
Living people
Soccer players from Adelaide
Australian people of Italian descent
Sportspeople of Italian descent
Australian people of Slovenian descent
Australian soccer players
Australian expatriate soccer players
Australia international soccer players
Olympic soccer players of Australia
A-League Men players
Belgian Pro League players
Eredivisie players
Premier League players
Scottish Premier League players
Adelaide City FC players
Cardiff City F.C. players
Central Coast Mariners FC players
Beerschot A.C. players
Middlesbrough F.C. players
NAC Breda players
Rangers F.C. players
National Soccer League (Australia) players
Expatriate footballers in England
Expatriate footballers in Scotland
Expatriate footballers in Belgium
Expatriate footballers in the Netherlands
Australian expatriate sportspeople in the Netherlands
Scottish Football League players
Australian expatriate sportspeople in Belgium
Australian expatriate sportspeople in England
Association football defenders
Australian expatriate sportspeople in Scotland
Marquee players (A-League Men)
Melbourne City FC non-playing staff
Footballers at the 1992 Summer Olympics
1997 FIFA Confederations Cup players
2001 FIFA Confederations Cup players
2004 OFC Nations Cup players
2005 FIFA Confederations Cup players